"Fascinating Rhythm" is a popular song written by George Gershwin in 1924 with lyrics by Ira Gershwin.

It was first introduced by Cliff Edwards, Fred Astaire and Adele Astaire in the Broadway musical Lady Be Good. The Astaires also recorded the song on April 19, 1926, in London with George Gershwin on the piano (English Columbia 3968 or 8969).

Many recorded versions exist. One of the rarest recordings is by Joe Bari (a pseudonym of Anthony Dominick Benedetto, later better known as Tony Bennett) for Leslie Records in 1949 and issued as catalog number 919 with "Vieni Qui" as the flip side. Having rerecorded it as a duet with Diana Krall in 2018 for their duet album Love Is Here to Stay, he currently holds the Guinness World Record for the "longest time between the release of an original recording and a re-recording of the same single by the same artist".

"Fascinating Rhythm" inspired the riff to the 1974 Deep Purple song "Burn".

The 1926 Astaire/Gershwin version and a 1938 version by Hawaiian steel guitarist Sol Hoʻopiʻi have both been added to the Library of Congress's National Recording Registry of "culturally, historically, or aesthetically important" American sound recordings.

Recorded versions

Maxene Andrews
Victor Arden and Phil Ohman (piano roll duet)
Fred Astaire and Adele Astaire with George Gershwin on piano - rec. April 19, 1926 - released on Columbia 3969 (WA 3184–1)
Fred Astaire - rec. December 1952
Tony Bennett (1949, as Joe Bari, re-recorded in 2018)
Louis Bellson - rec. February 1954 - released on the LP The Amazing Artistry of Louis Bellson
Georgia Brown
The Carpenters 1976
Petula Clark 1954
Rosemary Clooney 1980
Jacob Collier
Zez Confrey (piano roll)
Come Shine
Xavier Cugat 1962
Jamie Cullum
Vic Damone
Tommy Dorsey And His Orchestra - rec. January 12, 1943 - from the movie Girl Crazy (1943)
Cliff "Ukulele Ike" Edwards - rec. December 18, 1924 - released as Perfect 115690, matrix 105713-2
Les Elgart 1956
Percy Faith 1957
Michael Feinstein
Ella Fitzgerald - Ella Fitzgerald Sings the George and Ira Gershwin Songbook (1959)
Wayne Fontana 1965
The Four Tops 1999
Judy Garland
Jack Gibbons
Benny Goodman
Stephane Grappelli
Dave Grusin 1991
Vince Guaraldi Trio (1956)
Scott Hamilton - Live At Brecon Jazz Festival, 1995
Ted Heath
The Hi-Lo's
Earl Hines 1964
Sol Hoʻopiʻi
Dick Hyman
Antonio Carlos Jobim - recorded on the LP Passarim (1987)
Salena Jones
Stan Kenton 1953
Morgana King - rec. 1964 - released on the LP A Taste of Honey
Guillermo Klein - Una Nave (2005)
Lee Konitz
André Kostelanetz
Cleo Laine
Sam Lanin and His Roseland Orchestra - December 24, 1924 - Columbia 279-D
Enoch Light
Herbie Mann
Billy May
Susannah McCorkle
Maureen McGovern 1989
Jane Monheit and Mark O'Connor 2003
Mark Murphy 1956
Red Norvo 1956
Virginia O'Brien
Art Pepper
Oscar Peterson
Eleanor Powell - (1940s film Lady Be Good)
John Pizzarelli
André Previn 1998
Buddy Rich 1961
Freddie Rich (piano roll)
George Shearing 1989
Stuff Smith
The Spinners
Tommy Steele 1984
Claude Thornhill
Mel Tormé 1956
Leslie Uggams 1962
Caterina Valente
Sarah Vaughan - rec. August 15, 1964 and Gershwin Live!, 1982
Paul Whiteman Orchestra - December 29, 1924 - Victor 19551

References

External links 
 Newly discovered — Tony's first single under the name of Joe Bari!

Songs with music by George Gershwin
Songs with lyrics by Ira Gershwin
Fred Astaire songs
Caterina Valente songs
1924 songs
Songs from Lady, Be Good (musical)
United States National Recording Registry recordings